Events from the year 1533 in India.

Events
 Alauddin Firuz Shah becomes ruler of the Sultanate of Bengal following his father's (Nasiruddin Nasrat Shah) death
 Ghiyasuddin Mahmud Shah becomes ruler of the Sultanate of Bengal following his nephew's (Alauddin Firuz Shah) assassination

Births
 Sant Eknath writer born in Paithan (died 1599)

Deaths
 Nasiruddin Nasrat Shah, sultan of Bengal
 Alauddin Firuz Shah, sultan of Bengal

See also
 Timeline of Indian history

References

 
India